The 2011 All-Ireland Under 21 Football Championship is an under 21 Gaelic football inter-county competition between the 32 counties of Ireland. Four competitions are contested in each province and the winners of each provincial championship enters the all-Ireland series.

References

External links
Official Website

All-Ireland Under-21 Football Championships
All-Ireland Under 21 Football Championship